The Scarpe is a river in the Hauts-de-France region of France. It is a left-bank tributary of the river Escaut (Scheldt). The source of the river is at Berles-Monchel near Aubigny-en-Artois. It flows through the towns of Arras, Douai and Saint-Amand-les-Eaux. The river ends at Mortagne-du-Nord where it flows into the Scheldt. Scarpe Mountain in Alberta, Canada, was named after the river. The navigable waterway and its coal barges also feature in the novels by 19th century author Émile Zola.

Navigation 

The river was made navigable by weirs and locks over about two thirds of its length, divided into the Upper Scarpe (23 km, 9 locks) from Arras to Courchelettes, the Middle Scarpe through Douai, and the Lower Scarpe (36 km, 6 locks) from Douai to the Escaut. The Middle Scarpe is no longer navigable, bypassed by the high-capacity Canal Dunkerque-Escaut.

History 
This river was navigated from the Escaut up to Douai as early as 638, but improvements with flash locks were required to give access to the important town of Arras, reached in 1613. This remained a shallow navigation, with locks of varying width and length, until it was improved to the Becquey gauge in the 1840s. The enlargement to Freycinet gauge was completed by about 1890. Today the Lower Scarpe is closed from the Douai junction to Saint-Amand-les-Eaux pending dredging and identification of a new owner and operator.

The river and its valley were important battlegrounds in the First World War. The valley of the Scarpe has been designated as a protected Ramsar site since 2020.

References

External links
River Scarpe with further maps and details of places and moorings, by the author of Inland Waterways of France
Navigation details for 80 French rivers and canals (French waterways website section)

Rivers of Nord (French department)
Rivers of the Pas-de-Calais
World War I in the Pas-de-Calais
Rivers of Hauts-de-France
Rivers of France
Ramsar sites in Metropolitan France
Hauts-de-France region articles needing translation from French Wikipedia